A. Kasim Abas (born 1948) is a Malaysian watercolour artist.

Early life and education 
Abas was born in 1948 in Negeri Sembilan Malaysia. He was raised in a small fishing village to a Malaysian mother and Javanese father in the town of Port Dickson. He later went to the Government English School and completed his MCE (Malaysian Certificate of Education) and SC (Senior Cambridge) . He later admitted into a Teachers College in Seremban.

Career 
Upon graduating from Teachers College in Seremban, he is sent to a remote areas in Malaysia to teach students. In his isolations teaching at remote locations, he started drawing and painting in his free time. He later went to college to specialized in teaching art. While in college, he participated the Asian College Exhibition in Singapore which encourages him to pursuit painting professionally. In 1985, under the Patronage of the Malaysian Yang di-Pertuan Agong he exhibited in Washington DC and later with the patronage of the Malaysian Prime Minister Mahathir Mohamad, he exhibited in New York City; organised by the Mrs Nicoline Lopes. In 1992, he retired from teaching and pursuit painting full-time.

Art style 
A. Kasim Abas is a self taught artist known for his draughtsmanship and detailed watercolours drawings. He is adept at works with architecture, figurative works, sceneries and traditional crafts. A.Kasim Abas mostly works on commission based projects and rarely participate in exhibitions due to the slow process of him creating his paintings.

Publications 
 2005 | Sarawak Sketchbook - Illustrator
 2006 | Landmark of Perak - Illustrator 
 2011 | The encyclopedia of Malaysia - The Rulers Of Malaysia - Illustrator

Exhibitions 
 1982 | American Express Charity Art, The Regent, with Khalil Ibrahim & Yap Hong Ngee Kuala Lumpur, Malaysia
 1984 | Standard Chartered Watercolour Exhibition, Hotel Equatorial, with Mohamed Zain Idris Kuala Lumpur, Malaysia
 1985 | Washington DC, United States
 1985 | New York City, United States

Collections 
 AmBank Collection
 HSBC Bank Malaysia 
 CitiBank Malaysia
 UK Government 
 Sime Darby Plantation
 Golden Hope plantations

References

Further reading

External links 
 Kasim Abas / Paintings of Scenic Malaysia / Kasimabas

Malaysian painters
Living people
1948 births
Malaysian people of Malay descent
Malaysian Muslims
People from Negeri Sembilan